Pa Na is a Hmongic language spoken by about 1,000 people in Shangpai (上排), Zhongpai (中排), and Xiapai (下排) of Chengbu County, and Huangshuangping (黄双坪), Suining County in Hunan, China. It is also called "Red Miao." Yoshihisa Taguchi (2012) considers Pa Na to be most closely related to She and Jiongnai.

Yoshihisa Taguchi (2001) covers the Xiapai (下排) dialect of Pa Na.

Distribution
According to the Suining County Gazetteer (1997:657), in Suining County, Pa Na (坝哪话,; exonym: known as Zhaishanghua 寨上话 by the locals), is spoken by no more than 3,000 people in Tanni (潭泥), Moshi (磨石), Chiban (赤板), Jiexi (界溪), Shangbao (上堡), and other villages, all located in the southern part of Huangshuangping Township (黄双坪乡).

Taguchi (2001: 83) reports that Pana is spoken by about 1,100 people in the following five villages of Yanzhai Township (岩寨乡), Chengbu County, Hunan.
Shangpai (上排村)
Xiapai (下排村)
Desheng (得胜村)
Liuma (六马村)
Changxing (长兴村)

See also
Pana word list (Wiktionary)

References

 Pa Na numbers at lingweb.eva.mpg.de
 
 

Hmongic languages
Languages of China